The Attack on Jeddah occurred in 1541 and was the last attempt by the Portuguese to capture the city.

The Portuguese had previously attempted to capture Jeddah from the Ottomans in 1517, however, they were defeated, In 1541 the Portuguese fleet under the command of the Portuguese governor of India Estevao da Gama penetrated into the Red Sea with the aim of destroying the Ottoman fleet in Suez the Portuguese Destroyed several ports in their way including Suakin The Portuguese led by Estevao da Gama attacked Jeddah and attempted to take the city, The Portuguese fleet consisted of 85 ships, they landed in a port called Abu AI-Dawa'ir near Jeddah, the Ottoman garrison was at that time led by Ali Beg.

Upon hearing the arrival of the Portuguese, Abu Numayy called for jihad in Mecca, and many called the answer, Abu Nummay led the Meccan troops to support the ottoman garrison and expel the Portuguese, the joint Ottoman-Meccan force led by Ali beg and Abu Nummay successfully fended off the Portuguese attack and Jeddah was successfully defended. Abu Numayy was rewarded for his successful resistance by Sultan Suleiman the Magnificent who granted him half of the fees collected at Jeddah.

See also
Siege of Jeddah
Battle of Suakin (1541)
Battle of Suez (1541)

References

Battles involving the Ottoman Empire
1541 in military history
1541 in the Ottoman Empire
1541 in the Portuguese Empire